Richard Walker, Rick, Ricky, or Dick Walker may refer to:

Arts and entertainment
 Richard Walker (baritone) (1897–1989), English singer and actor

Law and politics
Richard Walker (MP) (1784–1855), British Member of Parliament for Bury, 1832–1852
Richard Wilde Walker (1823–1874), Confederate States of America politician
Richard Wilde Walker Jr. (1857–1936), U.S. court of appeals judge
Richard L. Walker (1922–2003), American scholar and ambassador
Richard H. Walker (born 1950), American lawyer
Rob Walker (New York politician) (Richard Robinson Walker, born 1974/5), American politician from New York

Academia
 Richard Walker (priest) (died 1567), English priest, former Archdeacon of Derby, Lichfield, and Dean of Chester
 Richard Walker (philosopher) (1679–1764), English professor of moral philosophy at the University of Cambridge

Sports

American football
Dick Walker (American football) (born 1933), American football player and coach
Rick Walker (born 1955), American football tight end
Ricky Walker (born 1996), American football defensive lineman

Association football (soccer)
Dick Walker (footballer, born 1913) (1913–1988), English football player for West Ham United
Richard Walker (footballer, born 1971), English football player for Notts County, Mansfield and Cheltenham Town
Richard Walker (footballer, born 1977), English football player for Burton Albion
Richard Walker (footballer, born 1980), English football player for Crewe Alexandra and Port Vale

Other sports
Dick Walker (Australian footballer) (1872–1947), Australian rules footballer for Carlton
Richard Walker (angler) (1918–1985), English angler and writer on angling
Frank Walker (Australian rules footballer) (a.k.a. Dick Walker, born 1933), Australian rules footballer for Perth
Richard Walker (equestrian), English equestrian

Others
 Richard Walker (engineer) (1900–1982), British aircraft designer of the Gloster Javelin
 Richard A. Walker (1946–1979), American commercial diver killed in Wildrake diving accident
 Richard Walker (editor) (born c. 1956), Scottish journalist
Richard Walker (businessman), managing director of Iceland, British supermarket chain

Other uses
 10717 Dickwalker, minor planet named for the astronomer